American Reformed Mission was an American Protestant Christian missionary society of the Dutch Reformed Church (now the Reformed Church in America), that was involved in sending workers to countries such as China during the late Qing Dynasty.

See also
Protestant missionary societies in China during the 19th Century
Timeline of Chinese history
19th-century Protestant missions in China
List of Protestant missionaries in China
Christianity in China

External links
History of Amoy Mission (China's First Protestant Church)

Dutch Reformed Church
Reformed Church in America
Christian missionary societies
Christian missions in China